The Honda British Talent Cup is a United Kingdom junior motorcycle racing series. It was founded in 2018 for riders at ages 12 to 17 from the British Isles to apply.

One rider will be given a chance to race full-time in the FIM CEV Moto3 Junior World Championship, while two drivers will race in the Red Bull MotoGP Rookies Cup. Honda is the series' bike supplier, providing the riders with the Moto3 Honda NSF250R.

In the inaugural 2018 season, Scottish rider Rory Skinner won the cup, 27 points ahead of Englishman Thomas Strudwick. In the second season, Scott Ogden clinched the victory, four points ahead of Cameron Horsman. In the Covid-19-struck 2020 season, Franco Bourne and Casey O'Gorman vied for the title, with Bourne coming out on top. O'Gorman won the 2021 season, winning eight races. He finished ahead of Carter Brown, who missed by six points in the final round at Donington Park.

Winners
 2018 – Rory Skinner moved to the British Supersport Championship in 2019, winning in  2020, then British Superbike Championship from 2020
 2019 – Scott Ogden (together with 2018 BTC season competitor Josh Whatley) will race for VisionTrack Honda Racing Team in the 2022 Moto3 season, run by Michael Laverty
 2020 – Franco Bourne 
 2021 – Casey O'Gorman will race in Red Bull Rookies during the 2022 Moto3 season

References 

Motorcycle racing in the United Kingdom
Motorcycle racing series
Recurring sporting events established in 2018